Buliminus, is a genus of air-breathing land snails, terrestrial pulmonate gastropod mollusks in the family Enidae.

Species 
Species within the genus Buliminus include:
 Buliminus labrosus

References

External links

 Nomenclator Zoologicus info

Enidae